Samuel Bertrand Itondo Eyoum (born 28 July 1987) is a footballer who plays as a midfielder. Born and raised in Cameroon, he has represented Equatorial Guinea internationally.

Career
Itondo was a member of the Deportivo Mongomo's squad in the 2011 CAF Champions League.

International career
Itondo made his senior debut with the Equatoguinean national team on 8 February 2011, when he played a friendly match against Chad.

Also, Itondo had B matches at the 2008 and 2009 CEMAC Cup, against the French side RSC Montreuil in 2011, Brittany, France U-20 and OGC Nice.

References

External links
Samuel Itondo Facebook's profile

1987 births
Living people
Footballers from Douala
Cameroonian footballers
Association football midfielders
Cameroonian expatriate footballers
Cameroonian expatriate sportspeople in Oman
Expatriate footballers in Oman
Cameroonian emigrants to Equatorial Guinea
Naturalized citizens of Equatorial Guinea
Equatoguinean footballers
Deportivo Mongomo players
AD Racing de Micomeseng players
Equatorial Guinea international footballers